Adrenodoxin-NADP+ reductase (adrenodoxin reductase, nicotinamide adenine dinucleotide phosphate-adrenodoxin reductase, ADR, NADPH:adrenal ferredoxin oxidoreductase) is an enzyme with systematic name adrendoxin:NADP+ oxidoreductase. This enzyme catalyses the following chemical reaction

 2 reduced adrenodoxin + NADP+  2 oxidized adrenodoxin + NADPH + H+

Adrenodoxin-NADP+ reductase is a flavoprotein (FAD).

References

External links 
 

EC 1.18.1